The Free Trade Party which was officially known as the Australian Free Trade and Liberal Association, also referred to as the Revenue Tariff Party in some states, was an Australian political party, formally organised in 1887 in New South Wales, in time for the 1887 colony election, which the party won. It advocated the abolition of protectionism, especially protective tariffs and other restrictions on trade, arguing that this would create greater prosperity for all. However, many members also advocated use of minimal tariffs for government revenue purposes only. Its most prominent leader was George Reid, who led the Reid Government as the fourth Prime Minister of Australia (1904–05). In New South Wales it was succeeded by the Liberal and Reform Association in 1902, and federally by the Anti-Socialist Party in 1906. In 1909, the Anti-Socialist Party merged with the Protectionist Party to form the Commonwealth Liberal Party.

History

The party was centred on New South Wales, where its leaders were Sir Henry Parkes and Sir George Reid. It dominated New South Wales colonial politics before federation. It first contested the 1887 New South Wales election.

At the 1901 elections for the first Commonwealth Parliament, the Free Traders, who campaigned in some states as the Revenue Tariff Party, formed the second largest group in the Australian House of Representatives, with 25 seats. Reid became the Parliament's first Opposition Leader with William McMillan as his deputy, later becoming Prime Minister in 1904–05. Dugald Thomson became deputy leader of the party in early 1904 following McMillan's retirement. Thomson would himself hand over the Deputy position to Joseph Cook on 28 July 1905 following the fall of the Reid Government.

A separate Tasmanian Revenue Tariff Party contested the 1903 federal election in Tasmania and won two seats but also sat and merged with the Free Trade Party in federal Parliament.

After the question of tariffs had largely been settled, Reid cast around for another cause to justify his party's existence. He settled on opposition to socialism, criticising both the Australian Labour Party and the support offered by it to the Protectionist Party, led by Alfred Deakin. Reid adopted a strategy of trying to reorient the party system along Labour vs non-Labour lines – prior to the 1906 election, he renamed the Free Trade Party to the Anti-Socialist Party. Reid envisaged a spectrum running from socialist to anti-socialist, with the Protectionist Party in the middle. This attempt struck a chord with politicians who were steeped in the Westminster tradition and regarded a two-party system as very much the norm.

The Labor Party and the FTP/ASP continued to grow in electoral strength at the expense of the Protectionist vote. Some Protectionists continued their exodus to Labor and the ASP.

When Deakin proposed the Commonwealth Liberal Party, a "Fusion" of the two non-Labour parties, Reid announced his intention to resign as party leader on 16 November 1908. Joseph Cook was elected leader unopposed on 26 November, and he led the party until the merger with the Protectionists. No deputy leader was elected under Cook.

Leaders

New South Wales Parliament

Australian Parliament

Electoral results

Parliament of New South Wales

Parliament of Australia

See also

 Liberalism in Australia
 Liberalism worldwide
 1901 Australian federal election
 1887 New South Wales colonial election

References

Bibliography

Australia 1880s
Defunct political parties in Australia
Political parties established in 1887
Political parties disestablished in 1909
1887 establishments in Australia
1909 disestablishments in Australia